Sandholme may refer to:

Sandholme, East Riding of Yorkshire
Sandholme, Lincolnshire